State Highway 48 (SH-48) is a  state highway in the U.S. State of Idaho. SH-48 runs from Interstate 15 (I-15) near Roberts to U.S. Route 26 Business (US 26 Bus.) in Ririe.

Route description
State Highway 48 starts at a diamond interchange with I-15 before heading due east on North Berrett Road through the town Roberts, where it becomes the road 627 North. SH-48 continues north on Old Highway 91 before turning east and leaving the city of Roberts as Roberts Highway (also known as 650 North), crossing Roberts Slough. Near the town of Lewisville, SH-48 turns south onto Saint Leon Road (alternatively known as North 3500 East), passing two schools as it enters the town of Lewisville. SH-48 continues due south out of the city limits before turning east onto Lewisville Highway (3500 East). The highway passes Philo T Farnsworth Elementary, Jefferson Elementary School, Rigby Middle School and Rigby Senior High School before entering the city of Rigby on West 1st South.

In the city, SH-48 intersects U.S. Route 20 Business, providing access to the US 20 freeway as SH-48 passes underneath the freeway with no direct access. SH-48 leaves the city as Ririe Highway before passing through more farmland, turning due south onto North 4500 East and then east again on East 150 North. The highway turns south again onto North 4600 East before making a final turn east on County Line Road, crossing into Bonneville County and ending at U.S. Route 26 Business in the town of Ririe.

Major intersections

References

048
Transportation in Jefferson County, Idaho
Transportation in Bonneville County, Idaho